The 1943 Rutgers Queensmen football team was an American football team that represented Rutgers University as a member of the Middle Three Conference during the 1943 college football season. In their sixth season under head coach Harry Rockafeller, the Queensmen compiled a 3–2 record, were co-champions of the Middle Three, and outscored their opponents 61 to 21. The team defeated Lehigh twice and split a pair of games against Lafayette.

Schedule

References

Rutgers
Rutgers Scarlet Knights football seasons
Rutgers Queensmen football